Sadie Carroway Robertson Huff (born June 11, 1997) is an American actress and businesswoman. She rose to fame on the A&E reality television show Duck Dynasty. She is a prominent Christian media personality and host of WHOA, That's Good Podcast.

Early life and work
Robertson is a granddaughter of Phil Robertson, founder of Duck Commander. Her parents are Korie (née Howard) Robertson and Willie Robertson, the company's current CEO. She has five siblings: John Luke Robertson, Rebecca Loflin, Willie Robertson Jr., Bella Robertson-Mayo, and Rowdy Robertson.

She sang Away in a Manger with Alison Krauss for her family's bestselling album, Duck the Halls: A Robertson Family Christmas.

Robertson was the first runner-up on Dancing with the Stars Season 19. Robertson also ventured into acting, with roles in the films God's Not Dead 2 and I'm Not Ashamed, and launched her successful "Live Original Tour" in the fall of 2016. Robertson toured with Winter Jam to 45 cities in 2017.

Robertson speaks at Passion Christian conference every January and other events to encourage believers.

Robertson partnered with Roma Boots and worked alongside them in their mission to "give poverty the boot."

In 2014, Robertson wrote a New York Times Best Seller book about faith and Christian values called Live Original. She also wrote a devotional by the same title (Live Original) and a fiction book, Life Just Got Real: A Live Original Novel (Live Original Fiction). In 2018, she released a sequel to her first book, Live Original, called Live Fearless. In 2020, she released Live: Remain Alive, Be Alive at a Specified Time, Have an Exciting or Fulfilling Life. This book encourages readers to thrive in God-given life, find confidence, deal with haters, live in the moment, discover the power of words, and wholeheartedly embrace God's ways so they can make the best choices. Sadie announced via Instagram that her newest devotional book was due September 2021 called Live on Purpose: 100 devotionals for letting go of fear and letting God.

On February 1, 2022, she published her newest book: Who Are You Following?: Pursuing Jesus in a Social-Media Obsessed World.

Personal life
On June 9, 2019, Robertson became engaged to Christian Huff. They married on November 25, 2019. On October 4, 2020, the couple announced via Instagram that they were expecting their first child, a girl. On May 11, 2021, Robertson gave birth to their daughter, Honey. On November 3, 2022, they announced via Instagram that they were expecting their second child, due in June 2023.

Filmography

Dancing with the Stars
In 2014, she was a celebrity competitor on Dancing with the Stars: season 19. She paired with professional dancer Mark Ballas and finished the competition in second place behind Alfonso Ribeiro.

Performance history

Bibliography

References

External links

 

Living people
21st-century American actresses
21st-century American non-fiction writers
21st-century American women writers
21st-century Christians
Actresses from Louisiana
American Christian writers
American members of the Churches of Christ
Christians from Louisiana
Howard family (Louisiana)
Louisiana Republicans
Participants in American reality television series
People from West Monroe, Louisiana
Robertson family
Writers from Louisiana
American women non-fiction writers
1997 births